The 2011 elections to Nottingham City Council were held on 5 May 2011 to elect all 55 members to the council.

The previous election was held in 2007 and the results were: Labour 42, Conservatives 7, Liberal Democrats 6. At the time of the 2011 election one Labour councillor, Mick Newton, had left the party and was an independent councillor. This left Labour with 41 councillors at the time of the election.

No ward boundary changes took place between the 2007 and 2011 elections.

The result of the election was notable for completely wiping-out the Liberal Democrats in Nottingham. The Conservative Party lost two seats, whilst Labour strengthened their position.

Overall results
A total of 55 councillors were elected from 20 wards in the city.

The expected declaration time was 4am on 6 May.

|}

Results by Ward

Arboretum

Aspley

Basford

Berridge

Bestwood

Bilborough

Bridge

Bulwell

Bulwell Forest

Clifton North

Clifton South

Dales

Dunkirk & Lenton

Leen Valley

Mapperley

Radford & Park

Sherwood

St Ann's

Wollaton East & Lenton Abbey

Wollaton West

By-Elections between May 2011 - May 2015

By-elections are called when a representative Councillor resigns or dies, so are unpredictable.  A by-election is held to fill a political office that has become vacant between the scheduled elections.

Bridge Ward by-election, (20 October 2011)

Due to the death of Cllr Ian McLennan (Labour), a by-election was called in the city's Bridge ward in October 2011. It took place on 20 October. The results were as follows:

Bilborough Ward by-election, (4 April 2013)

Wollaton East and Lenton Abbey Ward by-election, (4 April 2013)

Wollaton West Ward by-election, (6 June 2013)

Dales Ward by-election, (7 November 2013)

Radford and Park Ward by-election, (7 November 2013)

Clifton North Ward by-election, (6 March 2014)

See also
2011 United Kingdom local elections
2011 United Kingdom Alternative Vote referendum

References

2011
2011 English local elections
2010s in Nottingham